Andre Haughton is a Jamaican economist and politician.

Haughton was raised in Mount Salem, Saint James Parish, and attended Cornwall College before earning his master's degree in economics at the University of the West Indies, Mona. Haughton taught at UWI for two years, then began doctoral studies at the University of Essex, funded by the British Commonwealth Scholarship. Upon completing his doctoral degree, Haughton resumed teaching at UWI. He was later appointed a member of the board for the Students’ Loan Bureau. 

In January 2019, Haughton accepted a nomination as People's National Party parliamentary candidate for Saint James West Central. On 14 April 2019, Haughton was appointed to the Senate of Jamaica to replace Noel Sloley. Haughton was sworn into office as a senator on 26 April 2019.

References

Year of birth missing (living people)
Living people
Members of the Senate of Jamaica
Jamaican economists
University of the West Indies alumni
University of the West Indies academics
Alumni of the University of Essex
Jamaican expatriates in the United Kingdom
21st-century economists
20th-century economists
People's National Party (Jamaica) politicians
21st-century Jamaican politicians
People from Saint James Parish, Jamaica
Cornwall College, Jamaica alumni